Tija Gomilar Zickero (born 12 May 2000) is a Slovenian handball player for Neckarsulmer SU and the Slovenian national team.

She represented Slovenia at the 2020 European Women's Handball Championship, 2021 World Women's Handball Championship, 2022 European Women's Handball Championship-8th place.

References

 

2000 births
Living people
Slovenian female handball players
Handball players from Ljubljana